Davide Sanguinetti was the defending champion but did not compete that year.

Jan-Michael Gambill won in the final 6–0, 7–6(7–5) against Mardy Fish.

Seeds

  Andy Roddick (first round, retired)
  Guillermo Coria (first round)
  Marcelo Ríos (semifinals)
  Jan-Michael Gambill (champion)
  Arnaud Clément (first round)
  Raemon Sluiter (first round)
  Stefan Koubek (first round)
  Vince Spadea (second round)

Draw

Finals

Top half

Bottom half

References
 2003 Delray Beach International Tennis Championships draw

2003
2003 ATP Tour
2003 Delray Beach International Tennis Championships